Urban Heffernan (25 May 1901 – 21 September 1974) was an Australian cricketer. He played in two first-class matches for Queensland in 1924/25.

See also
 List of Queensland first-class cricketers

References

External links
 

1901 births
1974 deaths
Australian cricketers
Queensland cricketers
Cricketers from Queensland